Torment is the twelfth studio album from American death metal band Six Feet Under, released on February 24, 2017 by Metal Blade Records. It is the first album to feature drummer Marco Pitruzzella. It is the first album since 2013's Unborn to feature bassist Jeff Hughell, whom also plays all guitars on the album.

Background
Vocalist Chris Barnes gives an explanation about the album:

Track listing

Personnel 
Credits are adapted from the album's liner notes.

Six Feet Under
Chris Barnes – vocals, producer
Jeff Hughell – guitars, bass, recording (bass, guitars)
Marco Pitruzzella – drums

Miscellaneous staff
Zeuss – mixing, mastering
Carson Lehman – recording (drums, vocals)
Septian Devenum – artwork
Brian Ames – graphic design

Charts

References

2017 albums
Six Feet Under (band) albums
Metal Blade Records albums